The 21st Army was a German field army in World War II.

On 27 April 1945, towards the end of the war in Europe, the 21st Army was formed from Headquarters, 4th Army as part of Army Group Vistula (Heeresgruppe Weichsel) and fought until 8 May 1945.

Commanders

Citations

References

Bibliography

 

21
Military units and formations established in 1940
Military units and formations disestablished in 1945